Montebello was the second of four  torpedo cruisers built for the Italian Regia Marina (Royal Navy) in the 1880s. She was built at the Arsenale di La Spezia between September 1885 and January 1889, when she entered service. Montebello spent her active-duty career with the main Italian fleet, where she frequently took part in annual training exercises. In 1903, she was withdrawn from front-line service and converted into a training ship for engine room personnel; she served in this capacity until 1920, when she was sold for scrap.

Design

She displaced  normally. Her propulsion system consisted of three triple-expansion steam engines each driving a single screw propeller, with steam supplied by six coal-fired locomotive boilers. She had a crew of between 105 and 121.

The primary armament for Montebello was four  torpedo tubes. She carried a light gun battery for defense against torpedo boats. This consisted of six  40-caliber guns and two  20-cal. guns, all mounted singly.

Service history
The keel for Montebello was laid down at the Arsenale di La Spezia shipyard on 25 September 1885. She was launched on 14 March 1888 and completed on 21 January 1889. In 1893, Montebello was laid up in Naples for the year; at the time, the Italian fleet mobilized only a handful of vessels for the annual training maneuvers, preferring to keep the most modern vessels in reserve to reduce maintenance costs. She remained there through 1894.

In 1895, Montebello was stationed in the 2nd Maritime Department, split between Taranto and  Naples, along with most of the torpedo cruisers in the Italian fleet. In 1898, Montebello was assigned to the Levant Squadron that patrolled the eastern Mediterranean. She served on the station with Sardegna, Etruria, Monzambano, and the torpedo cruiser .

Later in 1898, Montebello was withdrawn from front-line service and employed as a training ship for engine room personnel. In 1903, her boilers were replaced with a variety of coal and oil-burning boilers manufactured by Pattison, Yarrow, and Thornycroft to give trainees several types of equipment to operate. At the outbreak of the Italo-Turkish War in September 1911, Montebello was stationed in Venice along with Tripoli and Goito. None of the vessels saw action during the war. The ship did not see action after Italy entered World War I either, as both the Italian and Austro-Hungarian fleets adopted cautious strategies. Montebello continued in service as a training ship until 26 January 1920, when she was stricken from the naval register and broken up for scrap.

Notes

References

External links
 Montebello Marina Militare website 

Goito-class cruisers
1888 ships
Ships built in La Spezia